Marie-Huguette Cormier (born 18 May 1961) is a Canadian fencer. She competed in the women's team foil events at the 1984 and 1988 Summer Olympics.

References

External links
 

1961 births
Living people
Canadian female fencers
Olympic fencers of Canada
Fencers at the 1984 Summer Olympics
Fencers at the 1988 Summer Olympics
People from Gaspésie–Îles-de-la-Madeleine
Sportspeople from Quebec
Laval Rouge et Or athletes